Holocola charopa is a species of moth in the family Tortricidae first described by Edward Meyrick in 1888. This species was previously placed in the genus Strepsicrates.  It is endemic to New Zealand.

References 

Moths described in 1888
Eucosmini
Moths of New Zealand
Endemic fauna of New Zealand
Taxa named by Edward Meyrick
Endemic moths of New Zealand